The UNESCO Picasso Medal, initiated in 1975, is awarded annually to musicians or musical institutions whose activity has contributed to the enrichment and development of music. It aims to serve peace, understanding between peoples and international cooperation as well as other purposes proclaimed by the United Nations Charter and UNESCO's constitution.

Recipients 
Alicia Alonso
Leonard Bernstein
Nadia Boulanger
Joan Brossa

Celina González
Herbert von Karajan
Dani Karavan
Nusrat Fateh Ali Khan
Yehudi Menuhin
Ariane Mnouchkine
Youssou N'Dour
Emmanuel Nunes
Octavio Paz
Oscar Peterson
Mohammad-Reza Shajarian
Dmitri Shostakovich
Mikis Theodorakis
Merceditas Valdés
Tahir Salahov
Augusto Boal

References 

UNESCO awards
Music award winners
Awards established in 1975